Fasel is a surname. Notable people with the surname include:

Charles Fasel (1898–1984), Swiss ice hockey player
Daniel Fasel (born 1967), Swiss football defender
Eva Fasel (born 1994), Liechtensteiner footballer
René Fasel (born 1950), Swiss retired ice hockey administrator

See also 
Fasel Gang, group of Swiss criminals
Fassel, surname